is an actress and singer.

External links
JMDb profile (in Japanese)

1961 births
Living people
Japanese actresses
Japanese women singers
Musicians from Hyōgo Prefecture
People from Takarazuka, Hyōgo